The 2016–17 Wright State Raiders men's basketball team represented Wright State University during the 2016–17 NCAA Division I men's basketball season. The Raiders, led by first-year head coach Scott Nagy, played their home games at the Nutter Center in Fairborn, Ohio as members of the Horizon League. They finished the season 20–12, 11–7 in Horizon League play to finish fifth place. In the Horizon League tournament, they lost to Northern Kentucky in the quarterfinals. Despite having 20 wins, they did not participate in a postseason tournament.

Previous season
The Raiders finished the 2015–16 season 22–13, 13–5 in Horizon League play to finish in a tie for second place. They defeated UIC, Detroit, and Oakland to advance to the Championship game of the Horizon League tournament where they lost to Green Bay. Despite having 22 wins, they did not participate in a postseason tournament.

On March 19, 2016  head coach Billy Donlon was fired. He finished at Wright State with a six-year record of 109–94. On April 4, the school hired Scott Nagy as head coach.

Departures

Incoming Transfers

Recruiting class of 2016

Roster

Schedule and results

|-
! colspan="9" style=| Exhibition

|-
! colspan="9" style=| Non-Conference regular season

|-
! colspan="9" style=| Horizon League regular season

|-
! colspan="9" style=|Horizon League tournament

References

Wright State Raiders men's basketball seasons
Wright State
Wright State Raiders men's b
Wright State Raiders men's b